Full Circle is the fourth studio album by American post-grunge band Creed, released on October 27, 2009. It was Creed's first release since disbanding in June 2004, prior to the release of their Greatest Hits compilation album in November 2004, and was their first studio album since Weathered in November 2001, as well as their first with their original bass guitarist Brian Marshall since his departure in August 2000. The record was produced by Howard Benson. The album was completed on July 31, 2009, as announced by Scott Stapp. The album cover was revealed through the band's official e-news on August 4, 2009. A two-disc version of Full Circle was released and contained a DVD with bonus content. The album had three music videos created for it: "Overcome" and "Rain" in 2009, and "A Thousand Faces" in 2010.

Title
The title of the album makes reference to the instrumental band members coming "full circle" with Scott Stapp to reform the band. The title track is about the Creed reunion and how it feels to be together as a band again.

Tour
The 2009 Creed Reunion Tour began on August 6 in Pittsburgh, Pennsylvania, and concluded on October 20, 2009, in Hidalgo, Texas. Originally, Flyleaf and Fuel were to be the opening bands, but the New Zealand band Like A Storm and Hoobastank opened for Creed in the first leg of the concert, while Lo-Pro and Staind opened for the second leg, with Saliva doing the last five dates and Like a Storm returning near the end of the tour. This reunion tour featured all of the original members of the band as well as the former Submersed guitarist Eric Friedman, a friend of Mark Tremonti's who performed rhythm guitars and backing vocals. The band played five songs ("Overcome", "Rain", "Bread of Shame", "Full Circle", and "A Thousand Faces") from their album Full Circle, as well as old hits throughout the tour. The band later went on to play "Suddenly" during their 2010 Summer tour, and "Time" during their 2012 Summer tour.

On October 24, 2009, it was confirmed by Scott Phillips that Creed was to go on a world tour in April 2010, starting in Australia and New Zealand, followed by South America, Europe, and Canada/North America. The tour dates were released on April 19, 2010.

Reception

The album received mixed to positive reviews from critics. Some critics stated that they appreciated the "new, heavier, darker side of Creed". Full Circle debuted at #2 on the Billboard 200, selling 111,000 copies in its first week.

Track listing

Original release

Bonus DVD
"Reconnection: 6 Years Later"
"Building the Tour: Concept and Design"
"The First Show: Night 1 – Pittsburgh"
"Full Circle"
"Making the Record: Full Circle is Born"
"E-Rock: Touring Guitarist"
"The Set List"
"Running the Tour: Production Crew"
"Overcome: The Video"

Personnel

Creed
Scott Stapp – lead vocals
Mark Tremonti – guitar, backing vocals, co-lead vocals on "A Thousand Faces" and "Away in Silence"
Brian Marshall – bass 
Scott Phillips – drums

Production
 Howard Benson – production, keyboards and programming
 Mike Plotnikoff – recording
 Paul DeCarli – digital editing
 Hatsukazu Inagaki – additional engineering
 Jeremy Underwood, Keith Armstrong, Nik Karpen, Brad Townsend, Andrew Schubert – assistant engineering
 Marc VanGool and Ian Keith – guitar tech
 Tony Adams – drum tech
 Chris Lord-Alge – mixing at Mix LA, Tarzana, CA
 Ted Jensen – mastering at Sterling Sound, New York, NY

Management
 Irving Azoff, Paul Geary, Jared Paul – management
 Orville Almon (Zumwait, Almon & Hayes) – legal representation
 Scott Adair and John Doran (London & Co.) – business management
 Ken Fermaglich (The Agency Group) – US booking agent
 Neil Warnock (The Agency Group) – international booking agent
 Diana Meltzer – A&R
 Gregg Wattenberg – A&R/Wind-up production supervision
 Jim Cooperman and Kim Youngberg – business affairs
 Mike Mongillo – product management

Artwork
 Daniel Tremonti (Core 12) – art concept, package design, photography
 Paul Natkin – band photography

DVD
 DC3 – footage provider
 Daniel E. Catullo III – DVD footage director
 Michael Romanyshyn, Lionel Pasamonte, Daniel E. Catullo III – producers
 Jonathan Fambrough and Michael Romanyshyn – editors
 Emmanuel Perez – assistant editor
 Mark Droescher – DVD author

Charts

Weekly charts

Year-end charts

Singles

Release history

References

Creed (band) albums
Albums produced by Howard Benson
2009 albums